The University of Arizona Mineral Museum (UAMM) is a mineralogy museum located in the Pima County Courthouse in downtown Tucson, Arizona.

Collections
The museum was started in 1892, and houses over 24,000 specimens from around the world, including meteorites, micromounts, and mining artifacts. 
Minerals from Arizona and Mexico are particularly well represented. Over 2,000 specimens are on display.

Also featured are a selection of oil paintings, depicting miners and mining, by Delaware artist William Davidson White (1896-1971).

References

External links
Official website
The Mineralogical Record Museum of Art

Mineralogy museums
Geology museums in Arizona
Museums in Tucson, Arizona
University museums in Arizona
University of Arizona
Museums established in 1892